Nick Rawsthorne (born 30 September 1995) is an English professional rugby league footballer who plays as a  or er for the Halifax Panthers in the RFL Championship.

He has played for Halifax in the Championship, and on loan from 'Fax at the South Wales Scorpions in League 1. Rawsthorne has also played for Hull F.C. in the Super League, and on loan from Hull at the York City Knights and Doncaster in League 1 and the Leigh Centurions in the Super League. He has also played for the Toronto Wolfpack in the Betfred Championship, and on loan from Toronto at York in Betfred League 1.

Background
Rawsthorne was born in Halifax, West Yorkshire, England.

Playing career
Rawsthorne grew up playing rugby union for Leeds Carnegie academy and represented England Academies from Under-16 to Under-18s. 
In 2016 he made his professional début for Halifax against the Bradford Bulls. He joined Hull F.C. in 2017 and made three appearances in the Super League for them. He joined Toronto Wolfpack for the start of the 2018 season on a two-year contract.

On 13 October 2019, it was announced by Hull Kingston Rovers that he had signed a two-year contract with the club.
On 24 February 2021, it was reported that he had signed for Halifax in the RFL Championship.

References

External links
Toronto Wolfpack profile
Hull F.C. profile
SL profile

1995 births
Living people
Doncaster R.L.F.C. players
English rugby league players
Halifax R.L.F.C. players
Hull F.C. players
Hull Kingston Rovers players
Leigh Leopards players
Rugby league centres
Rugby league players from Halifax, West Yorkshire
Rugby league wingers
South Wales Scorpions players
Toronto Wolfpack players
York City Knights players